Graham Douglas can refer to:

 Graham Douglas (cricketer) (born 1945), New Zealand cricketer
 Graham Douglas (sculptor) (1879–1954), American sculptor